Some May Live, also known as In Saigon Some May Live, is a 1967 British war film directed by Vernon Sewell and starring Peter Cushing, Joseph Cotten and Martha Hyer. It was shot at Twickenham Studios. During the Vietnam War, a security leak in Saigon has to be plugged, when American decoder Kate Meredith is faced with the dilemma of her husband pressuring her to give him information.

Cast
 Peter Cushing as John Meredith 
 Joseph Cotten as Colonel Woodward 
 Martha Hyer as Kate Meredith 
 John Ronane as Captain Elliott Thomas 
 David Spenser as Inspector Sung 
 Alec Mango as Ducrai 
 Walter Brown as Major Matthews 
 Kim Smith as Allan Meredith 
 Burnell Tucker as Lawrence 
 Carol Cleveland as Minor role

Critical reception
Leonard Maltin gave the film two stars, calling it an "Unexciting suspenser."

References

External links

1967 films
British war films
British spy films
Films directed by Vernon Sewell
Vietnam War films
Films shot at Twickenham Film Studios
1960s spy films
1967 war films
1960s English-language films
1960s British films